Micah Taul (November 25, 1832 – February 13, 1873) served as the 13th Secretary of State of Alabama from 1867 to 1868.

Taul was Secretary of the Alabama State Senate from 1856 to 1857. He was also a member of the Alabama Railroad Commission and served until he died in 1873.

He got married in 1854 and had two children.

References

1832 births
1873 deaths
Alabama Democrats
Secretaries of State of Alabama